Mared may refer to:

 Mared (village), a village in Iran
 Mared Williams, Welsh singer